Darius Cox (born March 16, 1983) is a Bermudian footballer who currently plays for Bermudian Premier Division side Robin Hood.

Club career
Cox began his career with Devonshire Cougars and played for the team for several years in the Bermudian Premier Division, helping the team to the BPD Championship in 2007. He was a part of the treble winning team in Bermudian Premier Division.

Cox has been part of the Bermuda Hogges squad in the USL Second Division since the team's inaugural season in 2007 and has been one of the first-choice defenders throughout his seasons with the team. Cox has also played 13 games for CBU Capers of the CIS in the 2011–12 season.

Cox joined Robin Hood from Cougars in November 2015.

International career
He made his debut for Bermuda in a September 2006 Caribbean Cup qualification match against the US Virgin Islands and earned a total of 20 caps, scoring 1 goal. He has represented his country in 2 FIFA World Cup qualification matches. He played in two of Bermuda's qualifying games for the 2010 FIFA World Cup, including their 3–1 victory over the Cayman Islands on March 30, 2008.

His final international match was a September 2012 Caribbean Cup match against Saint Martin.

International goals
Scores and results list Bermuda's goal tally first.

References

External links

 Profile - CBU Capers

1983 births
Living people
Association football defenders
Bermudian footballers
Bermuda international footballers
Bermuda Hogges F.C. players
USL Second Division players
USL League Two players
Bermudian expatriate footballers
Expatriate soccer players in the United States
Expatriate soccer players in Canada
Bermudian expatriate sportspeople in the United States
Bermudian expatriate sportspeople in Canada